The Sonoma County Board of Supervisors is a governing body with jurisdiction over Sonoma County, California. Among other things, the Board is responsible for managing Sonoma Water, the Northern Sonoma County Air Pollution Control District, the Agricultural Preservation and Open Space District, County Sanitation Districts, and the Community Development Commission.

Background 
The board is composed of five supervisors, each elected to serve four-year terms. Members of the Sonoma County Board of Supervisors receive a salary of $160,958 per year.

The current Chair of the Board of Supervisors is Susan Gorin, who represents District 1, and was elected by her colleagues on the Board.

Districts

See also

References

External links
 Sonoma County Board of Supervisors website

County government in California
County governing bodies in the United States
Sonoma County, California
Government of Sonoma County, California